Lawrence Barry is a Canadian actor. He is most noted for his performance in the 2016 film Riverhead, for which he received a Canadian Screen Award nomination for Best Actor at the 5th Canadian Screen Awards.

He has also appeared in the films Rare Birds, Away from Everywhere, Maudie, The Grand Seduction and Black Conflux, and the television series Republic of Doyle and Frontier.

References

External links

Canadian male film actors
Canadian male television actors
Canadian male stage actors
Male actors from Newfoundland and Labrador
People from Grand Falls-Windsor
Living people
Year of birth missing (living people)